Butwal Lumbini F.C. is a Nepalese professional franchise football club based in Butwal, Lumbini Province, that plays in the Nepal Super League (NSL), the top flight franchise football league in Nepal.

In the first season, the team finished fourth in the league table, and were eliminated by Lalitpur City in the eliminator.

History
The club was formed in March 2021 after the establishment of Nepal Super League the first-ever franchise football league in Nepal, under the supervision of All Nepal Football Association (ANFA). The club played its first match on 25 April 2021 against Pokhara Thunders.

Players

2021 squad

2022 squad

Team position by season
NSL, 2021: 4th

References

Football clubs in Nepal
Nepal Super League
2021 establishments in Nepal